"Fall into Me" is a song written by Danny Orton and Jeremy Stover, and recorded by Canadian country music band Emerson Drive.  It was released in July 2002 as the second single from their self-titled album.  The song peaked at number 3 on the Billboard country charts in January 2003. The song would remain the band's highest chart peak in the U.S. until the Number One hit "Moments" in 2007.

Music video
The music video was directed by Trey Fanjoy and premiered in mid-2002. It features the band performing the song in an aquarium, as a woman attempts to jump into a pool fully clothed and fall into her lover's arms underwater. The video was filmed at Newport Aquarium in Newport, Kentucky.

Chart positions 
"Fall into Me" debuted at number 43 on the U.S. Billboard Hot Country Songs for the week of July 20, 2002.

Year-end charts

References

2002 singles
2002 songs
Emerson Drive songs
Music videos directed by Trey Fanjoy
DreamWorks Records singles
Songs written by Danny Orton
Songs written by Jeremy Stover